Verneda Estella Thomas (June 21, 1936 - March 30, 2016) is a former volleyball player. She played for the United States national team at the 1964 Summer Olympics. Before she was an Olympic volleyball player, she was also an elite high jumper, winning a bronze medal at the 1955 Pan American Games in that event.

References

1936 births
Living people
Olympic volleyball players of the United States
Volleyball players at the 1964 Summer Olympics
Sportspeople from Chicago
American women's volleyball players
American female high jumpers
Pan American Games medalists in athletics (track and field)
Pan American Games bronze medalists for the United States
Athletes (track and field) at the 1955 Pan American Games
Medalists at the 1955 Pan American Games
21st-century American women